Chlorodendraceae is a family of green algae in the order Chlorodendrales.

References

Green algae families
Chlorodendrophyceae